Pseudohemihyalea mansueta is a moth in the family Erebidae. It was described by Henry Edwards in 1884. It is found in Mexico.

References

Moths described in 1884
mansueta
Arctiinae of South America